Slovak basketball club – TJ Iskra Partizánske
Slovak ice hockey club – HK Iskra Partizánske
Slovak handball club (renamed from Iskra Partizánske) – HK Slávia Partizánske
Slovak football club (renamed from Iskra Partizánske) – FK Tempo Partizánske